An ex officio member is a member of a body (notably a board, committee, council) who is part of it by virtue of holding another office. The term ex officio is Latin, meaning literally 'from the office', and the sense intended is 'by right of office'; its use dates back to the Roman Republic.

According to Robert's Rules of Order, the term denotes only how one becomes a member of a body. Accordingly, the rights of an ex officio member are exactly the same as other members unless otherwise stated in regulations or bylaws. It relates to the notion that the position refers to the position the ex officio holds, rather than the individual that holds the position. In some groups, ex officio members may frequently abstain from voting.

Opposite notions are dual mandate, when the same person happens to hold two offices or more, although these offices are not in themselves associated; and personal union, when two states share the same monarch.

For profit and nonprofit use 
Any ex officio membership (for example, of committees, or of the board) is as defined by the nonprofit association's bylaws or other documents of authority. For example, the bylaws quite often provide that the organization's president will be ex officio a member of all committees, except the nominating committee.

Governmental examples

Botswana
In Botswana's unicameral National Assembly, the President of Botswana and the Speaker of the National Assembly serve as the chamber's two ex-officio members.

Brazil
In the Empire of Brazil, some princes became members by right of the Imperial Senate once they turned 25.

China
According to the Constitution of the Chinese Communist Party, the General Secretary of the Central Committee must be a member of Politburo Standing Committee.

Hong Kong 
, the Executive Council of Hong Kong is still composed of ex officio members (official members since 1997) and unofficial members (non-official members since 1997). By practice the ex officio members include the secretaries of departments, i.e. the Chief Secretary, the Financial Secretary and the Secretary for Justice. Since 2002 all secretaries of bureaux are also appointed by the Chief Executive to be official members of the Executive Council. But since 2005 the secretaries of bureaux attend only when items on the agenda concern their portfolios.

Andorra
The President of the French Republic and the Catholic Bishop of Urgell are by virtue of office (ex officio) appointed Co-Princes of Andorra.

India
The Vice-President of India is ex officio Chairman of Rajya Sabha, the Upper House of the Indian Parliament.

The Prime Minister of India is ex  officio Chairman of NITI Aayog. Other ex officio members of NITI Aayog are the Minister of Home Affairs, the Minister of Finance, the Minister of Railways, and the Minister of Agriculture and Farmers' Welfare.

Philippines 
In Congress, the presiding officers and their deputies, and the majority and minority leaders, are ex officio members of all committees. The chairman on each chamber's committee on rules is the majority leader. The Senate President is the ex officio chairman of the Commission on Appointments, but can only vote on ties. In the Judicial and Bar Council, several positions are due to occupying another office.

In provincial boards, the provincial presidents of the League of Barangays (villages), Sangguniang Kabataan (youth councils) and of the Philippine Councilors League sit as ex officio board members. In city and municipal councils, the city and municipal presidents of the League of Barangays and the youth councils sit as ex officio councilors. In barangays, the youth council chairman is an ex officio member of the barangay council. The ex officio members have the same rights and privileges as the regular members of each legislature. The deputies of local chief executives (vice governors and vice mayors) are ex officio presiding officers of their respective legislatures, but can only vote when there is a tie.

Russia 
Russian Prime Minister, chairmans of State Duma and Federation Council, Chief of Staff and heads of federal subjects are ex officio members of State Council (an advisory body to the head of state). President of Russia is an ex officio chairman of it.

United Kingdom

House of Lords

In the House of Lords, the bishops of the five Great Sees of Canterbury, York, London, Durham, and Winchester are ex officio members, and are entitled to vote just as any other Lord Spiritual.

Formerly, anyone holding a title in the Peerage of the United Kingdom was ex officio a member of the House of Lords. This entitlement was abolished in 1999. Since then, only the Earl Marshal and the Lord Great Chamberlain (offices that are themselves hereditary) remain ex officio; another 90 hereditary peers are elected by and from among those eligible.

Scotland 
The Lord President of the Court of Session is by virtue of office appointed as Lord Justice General of Scotland. As such, he is both head of the judiciary of Scotland, president of the Court of Session (the most senior civil court in Scotland), and president of the High Court of Justiciary (the most senior criminal court in Scotland).

United States

Federal government 
The Vice President of the United States, who also serves as President of the Senate, may vote in the Senate on matters decided by a majority vote (as opposed to a three-fifths vote or two-thirds vote), if the votes for passage and rejection are equally divided. Also the leader of the parties in both houses are ex officio members of the House and Senate intelligence committees. Many committee chairs in the House of Representatives are ex officio members of subcommittees.

Colorado 
In most Colorado counties, the county sheriff is elected by the citizens of the county. However, in the City and County of Denver, the mayor of Denver appoints a "Manager of Safety" who oversees the Department of Safety (including the Fire, Police, and Sheriff Departments) and is the ex officio sheriff of the jurisdiction. Similarly, in the City and County of Broomfield, Colorado, near Denver, the police chief (an appointed position) also acts ex officio as the county sheriff.

New York City 
The Speaker of the New York City Council, and its Majority and Minority Leaders, are all ex officio members of each of its committees. Furthermore, each member of the Council is a non-voting ex officio member of each community board whose boundaries include any of the council member's constituents.

References

Bureaucratic organization
Organizational structure